Bonnie's Kitchen is Bonnie Pink's series of greatest hits albums. So far, two have been released:
Bonnie's Kitchen 1
Bonnie's Kitchen 2